This is a list of Mexican television related events from 2003.

Events
29 June - Silvia Irabien wins the second season of Big Brother México.
1 December - Radio and TV host Omar Chaparro wins the second season of Big Brother VIP.

Debuts

Television shows

Debuts

Ending this year

Births

Deaths

See also
List of Mexican films of 2003
2003 in Mexico